Favorites is a compilation album of hit songs by R&B singer Johnny Gill.

In October 2004, the remix of "Rub You the Right Way" appeared in popular video game Grand Theft Auto: San Andreas, playing on fictional new jack swing radio station CSR 103.9.

Track listing
"My, My, My"
"Quiet Time to Play"
"There U Go"
"Lady Dujour"
"If You're Wondering"
"Having Illusions"
"Where Do We Go From Here"
"Rub You the Right Way" (Remix)
"Fairweather Friend"
"Wrap My Body Tight"
"I Got You"
"Let's Get the Mood Right"
"Maybe"
"Give Love on Christmas Day" (Hidden bonus track)

References

Johnny Gill albums
1997 greatest hits albums
Motown compilation albums